Emily Brontë's Wuthering Heights is a 1992 feature film adaptation of Emily Brontë's 1847 novel Wuthering Heights directed by Peter Kosminsky. This was Ralph Fiennes's film debut.

This particular film is notable for including the oft-omitted second generation story of the children of Cathy, Hindley and Heathcliff.

Plot
The story is that of the fierce passionate love between the moor-loving, wild girl Catherine Earnshaw and the poor equally wild spirit her father takes in to be raised as her brother, Heathcliff. When her father dies, Catherine's biological brother, jealous that Heathcliff was their father's favorite, treats Heathcliff as a servant and has him beaten. The story tracks the story of Heathcliff's and Catherine's fierce love and Heathcliff's rage, pain, jealousy and vengeance that he pitilessly enacts on the man that gets in the way of his marrying her, Edgar Linton. Heathcliff and Catherine's love is painted in intense Romantic tones in contrast to the superficial artifice and shallow feeling of high society as represented by the Lintons. Ultimately Catherine dies and a devastated Heathcliff begs her to haunt him as a ghost. The story then follows how her daughter with Linton, and his son with Linton's sister – whom Heathcliff tricks into marrying him and then treats with great cruelty – fall in love. Theirs is the happy romantic ending that Heathcliff and Catherine are denied, except after death, walking as ghosts together on the moors.

Cast 
 Ralph Fiennes as Heathcliff
 Juliette Binoche as Catherine Earnshaw and Catherine Linton
 Jeremy Northam as Hindley Earnshaw
 Simon Shepherd as Edgar Linton
 Sophie Ward as Isabella Linton
 Janet McTeer as Nelly Dean
 Jason Riddington as Hareton Earnshaw
 Simon Ward as Mr. Linton
 Jennifer Daniel as Mrs. Linton
 Paul Geoffrey as Mr. Lockwood
 John Woodvine as Thomas Earnshaw
 Jonathan Firth as Linton Heathcliff
 Sinéad O'Connor as Emily Brontë

Production
Paramount Pictures was forced to use the author's name in the title of the film as Samuel Goldwyn Studio (later sold to Metro-Goldwyn-Mayer) owned the rights to the simple title Wuthering Heights due to the copyright on their 1939 film version of the novel.

The film stars Ralph Fiennes as the tortured Heathcliff and Juliette Binoche as the free-spirited Catherine Earnshaw, in a precursor to their later, successful collaboration on The English Patient.

The role of Heathcliff opened up doors for Ralph Fiennes to play Amon Goeth in Schindler's List. American director Steven Spielberg claimed he liked Fiennes for Goeth because of his "dark sexuality."

Critical response
The film received mostly negative reviews from film critics. Rotten Tomatoes gives the film a score of 25% based on 12 reviews, with an average rating of 4.20 out of 10.

The Independent wrote favorably of the film, and notes the fidelity of the movie to the dark sensuality and cruel side of Emily Bronte's character Heathcliff:
"Ralph Fiennes makes a demonic Heathcliff, his startlingly blue [sic] eyes the only concession to a matinee audience. This performance reminds us that early reviewers of the book were not wrong, when they wondered at the morbidity of its romanticism."

References

External links
 
 
 

1992 films
1992 romantic drama films
British romantic drama films
Films based on Wuthering Heights
Romantic period films
Films set in Yorkshire
Films set in the 19th century
Paramount Pictures films
Films directed by Peter Kosminsky
Films scored by Ryuichi Sakamoto
Films set in country houses
British films about revenge
1992 directorial debut films
1990s English-language films
1990s British films